El Golea Airport  is an airport in El Goléa, Algeria.

Airlines and destinations

The only airline operating regular flights to/from the airport is Air Algérie, serving the following destinations

References

External links 
 Google Maps - El Goléa
 Great Circle Mapper - El Goléa
 Airport Records for El Goléa International Airport at Landings.com
 

Airports in Algeria
Buildings and structures in Ghardaïa Province
El Ménia District